{{DISPLAYTITLE:C9H20NO2}}
The molecular formula C9H20NO2 (molar mass: 174.26 g/mol, exact mass: 174.1494 u) may refer to:

 Muscarine, or L-(+)-muscarine
 Butyrylcholine